Ubiquitin conjugation factor E4 A is a protein that in humans is encoded by the UBE4A gene.

The modification of proteins with ubiquitin is an important cellular mechanism for targeting abnormal or short-lived proteins for degradation. 

Ubiquitination involves at least three classes of enzymes: ubiquitin-activating enzymes, or E1s, ubiquitin-conjugating enzymes, or E2s, and ubiquitin-protein ligases, or E3s. This gene encodes an additional conjugation factor, E4, which is involved in multiubiquitin chain assembly.

References

Further reading